Chyung JinKyu (Hangul: 정진규; October 19, 1939 – September 28, 2017) was a South Korean writer.

Life
Chyung JinKyu (this was the preferred Romanization per LTI Korea) was born on October 19, 1939 in Anseong, Gyeonggi-do, Korea. Chyung attended Anseong Agricultural School, and then graduated from Korea University in 1964 with a degree in Korean Literature.

Chyung died on September 28, 2017 at Asan Medical Center in Seoul.

Work

While many poets focused on larger political issues Chyung displayed linguistic sensibility as he sang of life’s ambiguities and the contradictions of the times from a personal viewpoint. His early poetry is characterized by its beautiful, exquisite language, and its deep immersion in self-consciousness. From the mid-1960s, the poet grappled in his work with the conflict between life and poetry, which in turn, caused the poet serious inner turmoil. He attempted to overcome this essential conflict in his critical essays, "Siui aemaehame daehayeo" and "Siui jeongjikhame daehayeo." Despite his efforts, however, he could not easily find the positive balance between poetic indulgence and quotidian existence.

After the publication of his collection Deulpanui biin jibiroda, he began to incorporate elements of prose into his poetry, which enabled him to shift from a focus on individual to collective consciousness. In order to sustain this stylistic transformation, the poet engaged in a process that reaffirmed the fundamental poetical quality of his work. This process contributed to a significant development in Jung's aesthetic. One critic noted that Chyung JinKyu transfers the rhythm of nature with the eyes that discover the depth of human lives in nature.

Works in translation
 Tanz der Worte (정진규 시선)

Works in Korean (partial)
Poetry
 Mareun susukkangui pyeonghwa
 Yuhanui bitjang
 Deulpanui biin jibiroda(1977)
 Maedallyeo isseumui sesang
 Bieoisseumui chungman
 Yeonpillo sseugi
 Ppyeoe daehayeo
 Byeoldeurui batangeun eodumi mattanghada
Biography 
 Lee Sanghwa entitled, Madonna eonjendeul an gal su isseurya.

Awards
 Korean Poets Association Award (Hanguk siin hyeophoesang, 1980)
 Woltan Literature Prize (Woltan munhaksang, 1985) 
 Contemporary Poetry Award (Hyeondae sihak jakpumsang, 1987)

References 

1939 births
2017 deaths
Korean writers
People from Anseong
Society of Korean Poets Award winners